The Bestuzhev is a dual-purpose cattle breed from Uzbekistan created in the Soviet era by crossing the native Zebu cattle with Dutch Brown Swiss and Simmental bulls.

The breed shows resistance to bovine leukosis.

References 

 EAAP description and history, archived from the original.

External links
 Domestic Animal Diversity Information System hosted by FAO; images and breed description

 Red Dual-purpose Breeds: Bestuzhev (Bestuzhevskaya). FAO Animal Production and Health Paper 65: Animal genetic resources of the USSR. N.G. Dmitriev & L.K. Ernst (eds.). Food and Agriculture Organization of the United Nations. Rome, 1989.

Cattle breeds
Cattle breeds originating in Uzbekistan
Animal breeds originating in the Soviet Union